Majbat Assembly constituency is one of the 126 assembly constituencies of Assam Legislative Assembly. Majbat forms part of the Mangaldoi Lok Sabha constituency.

Members of Legislative Assembly

 1978: Silvius Condpan, Janata Party
 1983: Silvius Condpan, Indian National Congress
 1985: Silvius Condpan, Indian National Congress
 1991: Silvius Condpan, Indian National Congress
 1996: Silvius Condpan, Indian National Congress
 2001: Karendra Basumatary, Independent
 2006: Karendra Basumatary, Independent
 2011: Rakheswar Brahma, Bodoland People's Front
 2016: Charan Boro, Bodoland People's Front
 2021: Charan Boro, Bodoland People's Front

Election results

2016

See also
List of constituencies of the Assam Legislative Assembly
Darrang district

References

External links 
 

Assembly constituencies of Assam
Darrang district